The 1958–59 New York Rangers season was the franchise's 33rd season. The Rangers finished with a 26–32–12 record in the regular season, and did not advance to the NHL playoffs.

Regular season

Final standings

Record vs. opponents

Schedule and results

|- align="center" bgcolor="white"
| 1 || 8 || @ Chicago Black Hawks || 1–1 || 0–0–1
|- align="center" bgcolor="white"
| 2 || 11 || @ Boston Bruins || 4–4 || 0–0–2
|- align="center" bgcolor="#FFBBBB"
| 3 || 12 || @ Detroit Red Wings || 3–0 || 0–1–2
|- align="center" bgcolor="white"
| 4 || 15 || Boston Bruins || 4–4 || 0–1–3
|- align="center" bgcolor="white"
| 5 || 18 || @ Montreal Canadiens || 2–2 || 0–1–4
|- align="center" bgcolor="#FFBBBB"
| 6 || 19 || Montreal Canadiens || 5–3 || 0–2–4
|- align="center" bgcolor="#CCFFCC"
| 7 || 25 || Chicago Black Hawks || 6–2 || 1–2–4
|- align="center" bgcolor="#CCFFCC"
| 8 || 26 || Toronto Maple Leafs || 3–2 || 2–2–4
|- align="center" bgcolor="white"
| 9 || 29 || Boston Bruins || 2–2 || 2–2–5
|- align="center" bgcolor="#FFBBBB"
| 10 || 30 || @ Detroit Red Wings || 4–1 || 2–3–5
|-

|- align="center" bgcolor="#FFBBBB"
| 11 || 1 || @ Toronto Maple Leafs || 4–3 || 2–4–5
|- align="center" bgcolor="#FFBBBB"
| 12 || 2 || Detroit Red Wings || 2–1 || 2–5–5
|- align="center" bgcolor="#FFBBBB"
| 13 || 4 || @ Chicago Black Hawks || 4–2 || 2–6–5
|- align="center" bgcolor="#CCFFCC"
| 14 || 8 || @ Montreal Canadiens || 6–5 || 3–6–5
|- align="center" bgcolor="#CCFFCC"
| 15 || 9 || @ Boston Bruins || 5–1 || 4–6–5
|- align="center" bgcolor="#CCFFCC"
| 16 || 15 || Boston Bruins || 4–2 || 5–6–5
|- align="center" bgcolor="#CCFFCC"
| 17 || 16 || Montreal Canadiens || 2–1 || 6–6–5
|- align="center" bgcolor="#CCFFCC"
| 18 || 19 || Toronto Maple Leafs || 7–4 || 7–6–5
|- align="center" bgcolor="white"
| 19 || 22 || @ Toronto Maple Leafs || 2–2 || 7–6–6
|- align="center" bgcolor="#FFBBBB"
| 20 || 23 || Detroit Red Wings || 3–1 || 7–7–6
|- align="center" bgcolor="#CCFFCC"
| 21 || 26 || Montreal Canadiens || 5–3 || 8–7–6
|- align="center" bgcolor="#FFBBBB"
| 22 || 27 || @ Boston Bruins || 3–1 || 8–8–6
|- align="center" bgcolor="#FFBBBB"
| 23 || 29 || Boston Bruins || 3–1 || 8–9–6
|- align="center" bgcolor="white"
| 24 || 30 || @ Chicago Black Hawks || 2–2 || 8–9–7
|-

|- align="center" bgcolor="#CCFFCC"
| 25 || 3 || Chicago Black Hawks || 4–2 || 9–9–7
|- align="center" bgcolor="#FFBBBB"
| 26 || 6 || @ Montreal Canadiens || 6–0 || 9–10–7
|- align="center" bgcolor="#FFBBBB"
| 27 || 7 || Toronto Maple Leafs || 2–0 || 9–11–7
|- align="center" bgcolor="#FFBBBB"
| 28 || 10 || Detroit Red Wings || 2–1 || 9–12–7
|- align="center" bgcolor="white"
| 29 || 13 || @ Toronto Maple Leafs || 4–4 || 9–12–8
|- align="center" bgcolor="white"
| 30 || 14 || Chicago Black Hawks || 3–3 || 9–12–9
|- align="center" bgcolor="#CCFFCC"
| 31 || 18 || @ Detroit Red Wings || 2–0 || 10–12–9
|- align="center" bgcolor="#CCFFCC"
| 32 || 21 || Toronto Maple Leafs || 5–1 || 11–12–9
|- align="center" bgcolor="#FFBBBB"
| 33 || 25 || @ Montreal Canadiens || 4–1 || 11–13–9
|- align="center" bgcolor="#CCFFCC"
| 34 || 28 || Montreal Canadiens || 5–3 || 12–13–9
|- align="center" bgcolor="#CCFFCC"
| 35 || 31 || Boston Bruins || 4–3 || 13–13–9
|-

|- align="center" bgcolor="#CCFFCC"
| 36 || 1 || @ Boston Bruins || 5–2 || 14–13–9
|- align="center" bgcolor="#FFBBBB"
| 37 || 3 || @ Montreal Canadiens || 5–1 || 14–14–9
|- align="center" bgcolor="#FFBBBB"
| 38 || 4 || Toronto Maple Leafs || 4–2 || 14–15–9
|- align="center" bgcolor="#FFBBBB"
| 39 || 7 || Chicago Black Hawks || 4–0 || 14–16–9
|- align="center" bgcolor="white"
| 40 || 10 || Detroit Red Wings || 3–3 || 14–16–10
|- align="center" bgcolor="#CCFFCC"
| 41 || 11 || @ Chicago Black Hawks || 4–3 || 15–16–10
|- align="center" bgcolor="#CCFFCC"
| 42 || 14 || @ Toronto Maple Leafs || 3–2 || 16–16–10
|- align="center" bgcolor="#FFBBBB"
| 43 || 17 || @ Chicago Black Hawks || 7–1 || 16–17–10
|- align="center" bgcolor="#CCFFCC"
| 44 || 18 || @ Detroit Red Wings || 4–2 || 17–17–10
|- align="center" bgcolor="#FFBBBB"
| 45 || 24 || @ Montreal Canadiens || 3–1 || 17–18–10
|- align="center" bgcolor="#CCFFCC"
| 46 || 25 || @ Boston Bruins || 8–3 || 18–18–10
|- align="center" bgcolor="#FFBBBB"
| 47 || 28 || Chicago Black Hawks || 3–1 || 18–19–10
|- align="center" bgcolor="#CCFFCC"
| 48 || 31 || @ Toronto Maple Leafs || 5–2 || 19–19–10
|-

|- align="center" bgcolor="#CCFFCC"
| 49 || 1 || Detroit Red Wings || 5–4 || 20–19–10
|- align="center" bgcolor="#CCFFCC"
| 50 || 5 || @ Detroit Red Wings || 5–0 || 21–19–10
|- align="center" bgcolor="#FFBBBB"
| 51 || 7 || Chicago Black Hawks || 6–3 || 21–20–10
|- align="center" bgcolor="#FFBBBB"
| 52 || 8 || @ Boston Bruins || 4–1 || 21–21–10
|- align="center" bgcolor="#FFBBBB"
| 53 || 11 || Boston Bruins || 5–3 || 21–22–10
|- align="center" bgcolor="#FFBBBB"
| 54 || 12 || @ Detroit Red Wings || 1–0 || 21–23–10
|- align="center" bgcolor="#FFBBBB"
| 55 || 15 || Montreal Canadiens || 5–1 || 21–24–10
|- align="center" bgcolor="#FFBBBB"
| 56 || 18 || @ Chicago Black Hawks || 4–2 || 21–25–10
|- align="center" bgcolor="white"
| 57 || 21 || @ Toronto Maple Leafs || 1–1 || 21–25–11
|- align="center" bgcolor="#CCFFCC"
| 58 || 22 || Montreal Canadiens || 5–1 || 22–25–11
|- align="center" bgcolor="#CCFFCC"
| 59 || 25 || Detroit Red Wings || 6–3 || 23–25–11
|- align="center" bgcolor="#FFBBBB"
| 60 || 28 || @ Montreal Canadiens || 6–1 || 23–26–11
|-

|- align="center" bgcolor="white"
| 61 || 1 || Toronto Maple Leafs || 1–1 || 23–26–12
|- align="center" bgcolor="#CCFFCC"
| 62 || 7 || @ Chicago Black Hawks || 6–1 || 24–26–12
|- align="center" bgcolor="#CCFFCC"
| 63 || 8 || Detroit Red Wings || 4–2 || 25–26–12
|- align="center" bgcolor="#FFBBBB"
| 64 || 11 || Chicago Black Hawks || 5–3 || 25–27–12
|- align="center" bgcolor="#FFBBBB"
| 65 || 12 || @ Boston Bruins || 5–4 || 25–28–12
|- align="center" bgcolor="#FFBBBB"
| 66 || 14 || @ Toronto Maple Leafs || 5–0 || 25–29–12
|- align="center" bgcolor="#FFBBBB"
| 67 || 15 || Toronto Maple Leafs || 6–5 || 25–30–12
|- align="center" bgcolor="#FFBBBB"
| 68 || 18 || Boston Bruins || 5–3 || 25–31–12
|- align="center" bgcolor="#CCFFCC"
| 69 || 21 || @ Detroit Red Wings || 5–2 || 26–31–12
|- align="center" bgcolor="#FFBBBB"
| 70 || 22 || Montreal Canadiens || 4–2 || 26–32–12
|-

Playoffs
The Rangers failed to qualify for the 1959 Stanley Cup playoffs.

Player statistics
Skaters

Goaltenders

†Denotes player spent time with another team before joining Rangers. Stats reflect time with Rangers only.
‡Traded mid-season. Stats reflect time with Rangers only.

Awards and records

Transactions

See also
1958–59 NHL season

References

New York Rangers seasons
New York Rangers
New York Rangers
New York Rangers
New York Rangers
Madison Square Garden
1950s in Manhattan